HHS may refer to:

Health and medicine 
 Hamilton Health Sciences, in Ontario, Canada
 Hyperosmolar hyperglycemic state
 Hoyeraal-Hreidarsson syndrome
 United States Department of Health and Human Services

Schools

 Hastings High School (disambiguation)
 Hamilton High School (disambiguation)
 Heritage High School (disambiguation)
 Highland High School (disambiguation)
 Hillsboro High School (disambiguation)
 Huntsville High School (disambiguation)
 Holland High School (disambiguation)

Canada
 Halton High School, Toronto, Ontario
 Hilltop High School (Whitecourt), Alberta

United Kingdom
 Hereward House School, London England
 Heartlands High School, London, England
 Hadleigh High School, Hadleigh, Ipswich, England

United States
 Hall High School (Connecticut)
 Hall High School (Illinois)
 Hampshire High School (Illinois)
 Hampshire High School (West Virginia)
 Hanover High School (New Hampshire)
 Hardaway High School, Columbus, Georgia
 Hardee High School, Wauchula, Florida
 Harlingen High School, Texas
 Harmony High School, Florida
 Harrisburg High School (Arkansas)
 Harrisburg High School (Oregon)
 Harrison High School (Arkansas)
 Harrison High School (New Jersey)
 Harrison High School (New York)
 Harrisonburg High School (Virginia)
 Harriton High School (Pennsylvania)
 Hartsville High School, South Carolina
 Harvard High School (Illinois)
 Havana High School, Illinois
 Haverford High School, Pennsylvania
 Haverhill High School, Massachusetts
 Havre De Grace High School, Maryland
 Hayward High School (Wisconsin)
 Healdsburg High School, California
 Helena High School (Alabama)
 Hempfield High School, inLandisville, Pennsylvania
 Hempstead High School (Dubuque, Iowa)
 Henderson High School (Pennsylvania)
 Hendersonville High School (Tennessee)
 Hereford High School (Parkton, Maryland), Maryland 
 Hermiston High School, Oregon
 Hernando High School (Florida)
 Herriman High School, Utah
 Herrin High School, Illinois
 Hibriten High School, Lenoir, North Carolina
 Hickman High School, Columbia, Missouri
 Highland High School (Pocatello, Idaho)
 Hightower High School, Missouri City, Texas
 Hillsborough High School (New Jersey)
 Hillsborough High School (Tampa, Florida)
 Hillside High School (Durham, North Carolina)
 Hillwood High School, Nashville, Tennessee
 Hirschi High School, Wichita Falls, Texas
 Hobbs High School, New Mexico
 Holcomb High School, Kansas
 Holliston High School, Massachusetts
 Holly High School, Michigan
 Homestead High School (Cupertino, California)
 Homewood High School, Birmingham, Alabama
 Hornbeck High School, Louisiana
 Hortonville High School, Wisconsin
 Howell High School (Howell, Michigan)
 Holyoke High School, Massachusetts
 Hubbard High School (Ohio)
 Hudson High School (Ohio)
 Hudsonville High School, Michigan
 Hughes High School, Arkansas
 Humble High School, Texas
 Hudson High School (Massachusetts)
 Hueneme High School, Oxnard, California
 Huffman High School, Birmingham, Alabama
 Huntingtown High School, Maryland
 Huron High School (Ann Arbor, Michigan)
 Hutchinson High School (Kansas)
 Hutchinson High School (Minnesota)

Other places
 Holroyd High School, Greystanes, New South Wales, Australia
 Hutchings High School, Pune, Maharashtra, India
 The Hague University of Applied Sciences, Netherlands
 Henderson High School (Auckland), New Zealand
 Stockholm School of Economics, Sweden

Other uses 
 Hénon-Heiles System
 Huguenot Street Historic District, in New Paltz, New York, United States
 Harte Hanks, global marketing services firm which trades on the NASDAQ as HHS